The Palacio de Valle, also called Palacio del Valle, is a historic villa in Cienfuegos, Cuba, built by the Italian architect, Alfredo Colli, from 1913 to 1917 and reminiscent of Moorish architecture.

The original client of the villa was the merchant Celestino Caces, who then sold it to Acisclo del Valle, who had its construction completed. Today, the villa is occupied by an upscale hotel and restaurant.

References 

 
 
 

Revival architectural styles
Buildings and structures in Cienfuegos
1910s architecture
Hotels in Cuba
Villas in Cuba
1917 establishments in Cuba
Buildings and structures completed in 1917
20th-century architecture in Cuba